The Young and the Restless is an American television soap opera, created by William J. Bell and Lee Phillip Bell for CBS. It first aired on March 26, 1973. The longest-running cast member is Doug Davidson, who has portrayed private investigator Paul Williams since May 23, 1978. Jeanne Cooper, who portrayed the soap opera's matriarch Katherine Chancellor, previously held the record for the series' longest-running cast member, airing from November 1973 until her death in May 2013. Melody Thomas Scott and Eric Braeden, who portray Nikki and Victor Newman, are the second and third longest-running currect cast members, having joined in February 1979 and February 1980, respectively. Kate Linder has portrayed Esther Valentine since April 1982, and rounds out the series' top four longest-running cast members. The following list is of cast members who are currently on the show: both main and recurring members, as well as those who are debuting, departing or returning from the series.

Cast

Main cast

Recurring cast

Cast changes

Returning

Previous cast members

References

Citations

External links
Soaps.com  – The Young and the Restless

Young and the Restless
Cast members